Hofit (lit.Coastal) is a community settlement in central Israel on the coast of the Mediterranean Sea near Netanya, it falls under the jurisdiction of Hefer Valley Regional Council.

History
The village was established in the early 1950s for workers who wanted an agricultural lifestyle. The first residents moved in 1952, and the village was officially recognised in 1955. Its name is taken from its proximity to the sea.

Notable residents
 Lee Korzits, Olympic and world champion windsurfer

References

Community settlements
Populated places in Central District (Israel)
Populated places established in 1952
1952 establishments in Israel